The Mayflies USA are a Chapel Hill, North Carolina-based rock band signed to Yep Roc Records.  The band is a classic example of power pop, as their songs featured catchy melodies, vocal harmonies, and prominent guitar riffs.  Their style was influenced by older bands such as The Beatles, Big Star, and also more contemporary groups like Teenage Fanclub and Velvet Crush.

History 
The band released their debut EP in 1997, and their next three albums were released by Yep Roc.  North Carolina producer Chris Stamey (formerly of The dB's, and credited by the band as the "fifth" Mayfly) produced their first two records for Yep Roc, Summertown and The Pity List.

Spin Magazine called Summertown "r-o-c-k like they don't make anymore, in love with early Eagles and Bob Welch, in bed with Wilco but dreaming of the Replacements and Pure Prairie League and proud of it."

Keith Cleversley, who produced The Flaming Lips and Mercury Rev, worked on their 2002 record Walking in a Straight Line.  The band's albums garnered favorable reviews in publications such as The Washington Post, Spin, The Village Voice, Allmusic and The Boston Phoenix;.  In 2007 and 2009, the band reunited for some shows.

On May 16, 2012, Billboard Magazine announced the band would reunite for one show as part of Yep Roc Records' 15 Year Anniversary celebration.

On August 21, 2012, Yep Roc reissued Summertown, this time on vinyl.

Guitarist Matt McMichaels is the singer and primary songwriter in Surrender Human with bassist Robert Sledge and drummer Tony Stiglitz. He was also a core member in Chris Stamey's Big Star Third project  with Mike Mills, Jody Stephens, and Mitch Easter.

Guitarist Matt Long went on to form The Library, a Brooklyn-based band that has released three albums, and has worked as production coordinator on projects for Keith Richards.

Bassist Adam Price has written two critically acclaimed novels, The Grand Tour (Doubleday, 2016) and The Hotel Neversink (Tin House Books, 2019).

Discography

References

External links 
 Mayflies USA at Yep Roc Records

Indie rock musical groups from North Carolina
Musical groups established in 1997
Musical groups from Chapel Hill-Carrboro, North Carolina
American power pop groups
Yep Roc Records artists